William Mack Brown (born August 27, 1951) is an American college football coach.  He is currently in his second stint as the head football coach for the University of North Carolina, where he first coached from 1988 until departing in 1997, when he left Chapel Hill to become head coach for the University of Texas. In 2018, Brown was inducted into the College Football Hall of Fame. Two days after Carolina fired Larry Fedora in November 2018, Brown was announced to return as the Tar Heels' head coach after a five-year hiatus from coaching, which he spent as an ESPN analyst.

Prior to his head coach positions at Texas and North Carolina, Brown was head coach for Appalachian State and later, Tulane. He is credited with revitalizing the North Carolina and Texas football programs.

Brown coached the Longhorns to victory against the top-ranked USC Trojans at the 2006 Rose Bowl game to cap off an undefeated season, win a second consecutive Rose Bowl, and the national championship in what has been considered the greatest game in college football history. Brown's Longhorns defeated Red River Showdown conference rival Oklahoma in 1998, 1999, 2005, 2006, 2008, 2009, and 2013.

In 2006, he was awarded the Paul "Bear" Bryant Award for "Coach of the Year". Brown achieved his 200th career win during the 2008 season, making him the first Texas coach to reach that mark. He resigned after the 2013 Alamo Bowl, leaving as the second-winningest coach in program history (11 wins behind Darrell Royal).

Since returning to Chapel Hill, Brown has become Carolina's all-time winningest coach, passing Dick Crum for most wins in program history.

Early life
Brown was born as the middle of three boys (brothers Mel and Watson) on August 27, 1951, in Cookeville, Tennessee. During his teenage years, he attended Putnam County High School. Brown's family had a long history with football. His grandfather, Eddie Watson, was an athlete at Tennessee Tech and a coach at Putnam County High School for more than three decades. His father, Melvin Brown, was also a coach and an administrator. Mack's older brother Watson also coached, and was the head football coach at a total of six Division I football schools, ending his career with their hometown school, Tennessee Tech. Mack attended Vanderbilt University before attending Florida State University and graduating in 1974. He later received a graduate degree from the University of Southern Mississippi in 1976. During his undergraduate years, Brown was a member of Sigma Alpha Epsilon fraternity.

Playing career
Brown was a three-sport star at Putnam County High School, playing football, basketball and baseball.  After his senior season, he won All-State as well as Prep All-America honors and was selected one of the nation's top running backs by Scholastic Magazine his senior year. The Tennessean selected him as the state player of the year.

He accepted a football scholarship to Vanderbilt University, where his brother Watson Brown was the starting quarterback. In his time playing for the Vanderbilt Commodores, he played for Bill Pace and rushed 82 times for 364 yards and three touchdowns, as well as catching seven passes for 50 yards and a touchdown during the 1970 season.

Brown then transferred to Florida State University. Brown played for Florida State under head coach Larry Jones. At Florida State he had 31 rushing attempts for 98 yards and 10 catches for 76 yards with no touchdowns in the 1972 season. Lettering twice as a running back for the Seminoles, he started his coaching career as a student coach after five knee surgeries ended his career prematurely.

Coaching career

Early positions
Brown's first experience coaching came as a student coach of wide receivers at Florida State, a position he held in 1973 and 1974. From 1975 to 1977, he was the wide receivers coach at Southern Miss. This was followed by a one-year stint as wide receivers coach at Memphis State.

For the 1979 season, he joined the staff of Iowa State, again as a wide receivers coach, before a promotion to offensive coordinator. In 1980, after going 3–8 the year prior, Iowa State improved their record to 6–5 in large part due to running back Dwayne Crutchfield (1,312 yards with 11 TD) and the rest of Brown's offense. The team scored 108 more points that year than they had in 1979. In 1981, the team finished with a 5–5–1 record, despite starting out with a record of 5–1–1. RB Dwayne Crutchfield was again a key focal point in Brown's offense and ran for 1,189 yards with 17 TD.

In 1982, Brown moved to LSU as the quarterbacks coach. The LSU Tigers improved their record to 8–3–1 from 3–7–1 the year prior in large part due to Brown's coaching of quarterback Alan Risher, who threw for 1,834 yards with 17 TD and 8 INT. He also completed 63.7% of his pass attempts. Risher had thrown 14 TD in the previous two seasons combined before Brown's arrival.

Appalachian State
Brown's first head coaching job came in 1983 when he led Appalachian State to a 6–5 record. In December 1983, he was seriously considered for the head coaching position at LSU which had been vacated after Jerry Stovall was fired, but the position instead went to Miami Dolphins defensive coordinator Bill Arnsparger.

Oklahoma
Brown moved back to a role as offensive coordinator for the Oklahoma Sooners during the 1984 season under head coach Barry Switzer. Oklahoma would run for 2,376 yards as a team that season, averaging 216 yards a game. QB Danny Bradley also would throw for nearly 1,000 yards with 8 TD vs 5 INT. RBs Lydell Carr, Steve Sewell, and Spencer Tillman combined to run for 1,651 yards with 12 TD.

Tulane
Brown's second head coaching position came with Tulane in 1985, where he also became the school's athletic director in the wake of a point shaving scandal which led to the shutdown of the men's basketball program. Despite a slow start (a 1–10 record in his first year), he made gradual improvement, leading the Green Wave to a 4–7 record in 1986 and, in 1987, to a 6–6 record and a trip to the Independence Bowl, Tulane's fifth bowl game in over 40 years and last until 1998.

North Carolina
In 1988, Brown was named the head coach at North Carolina. Brown's first two teams finished with identical 1–10 records, the worst two seasons that the Tar Heels have suffered on the field in modern times.  However, the next two years saw a relatively quick return to respectability. In 1990, the Tar Heels finished 6–4–1. By comparison, the Tar Heels had won only seven games in the previous three years. Included in the 1990 total was a tie of Georgia Tech that proved to be the Yellow Jackets' only non-win that season en route to a share of the national championship. In 1991, the Tar Heels finished 7–4, narrowly missing a bowl bid.

Everything finally came together for the Tar Heels in 1992. They finished 8–3 in the regular season and second in the Atlantic Coast Conference, and with a victory over Mississippi State in the Peach Bowl, they finished the season at 9–3. The Peach Bowl was the program's first bowl appearance since 1986 and their first bowl win since 1982. They also notched their first appearance in a final Top 25 poll since 1982.

The 1992 season was the start of UNC's most successful period since the Charlie Justice era in the late 1940s. Brown coached the Tar Heels to five consecutive bowl games, including UNC's only two New Year's Day bowl games in more than half a century (or three, if one counts the 1992–93 Peach Bowl, which was played the day after New Year's to avoid a conflict with the Sugar Bowl). They were ranked in the AP Top 25 every week from October 1992 through the start of the 1995 season. They finished in the final rankings in four out of five years, including two straight appearances in the top 10. They also won 10 regular-season games in 1993 and 1997, only the second and third times the Tar Heels have accomplished this. Largely due to Florida State joining the league in 1992, Brown was unable to win an ACC title—something the Tar Heels haven't done since 1980.

Brown's time at UNC also saw renewed popularity for a team that had long played in the shadow of the school's powerhouse basketball team. Games at Kenan Memorial Stadium were almost always sold out, the highlight being a standing-room only crowd of 62,000 that watched the Tar Heels play Florida State in 1997, still the largest crowd to watch a college football game on campus in the state of North Carolina. Brown also spearheaded a major renovation to Kenan Stadium that featured upgraded team facilities and an expansion to 60,000 seats.

Brown was offered the head coaching position at Oklahoma in 1995. He turned the job down and it instead went to Howard Schnellenberger.

Not long after the end of the 1997 season, Brown accepted the head coaching job at Texas. His defensive coordinator, Carl Torbush, coached the Tar Heels in that year's Gator Bowl. North Carolina credits the 1997 regular season to Brown and the Gator Bowl to Torbush.

Texas

In his early years at UT, Brown was referred to as "Coach February," due to his success in bringing in high talent recruits. His detractors felt that with all the resources at his disposal at Texas, combined with the talent he was recruiting from high school programs, that he should have more to show for it than appearances in the Holiday Bowl or Cotton Bowl Classic. They felt that he should be playing for Big 12 titles or even National Championships instead.

In five of the first seven seasons under Brown, the Longhorns were all but eliminated from either of these two goals due to losses in October to Big 12 rival Oklahoma. Since the two teams played in the same division of the Big 12, a loss by Texas to Oklahoma meant that Texas could not win the south division of the conference unless Oklahoma lost at least two conference games. However, in 1999 Brown led Texas to their second Big 12 title game where they were beaten by a higher ranked Nebraska team that they had beaten earlier in the year. In 2001, Brown took Texas to their 3rd Big 12 title game. In that year's campaign, the Longhorns lost to the Sooners, but were given another chance when the Sooners lost to both Nebraska and Oklahoma State. Texas lost the Big 12 Championship Game to Colorado, a school they had beaten by a substantial margin earlier in the year. Many felt that Texas would have played in the BCS Championship game had they beaten Colorado. A similar opportunity presented itself in 2002. After Oklahoma beat Texas, they lost to Texas A&M and Oklahoma State. However, Texas suffered a loss to Texas Tech, so they did not make the championship game.

In 2003, Texas finished the regular season with a 10–2 regular season record, and most observers felt they had the resume to reach their first BCS bowl under Brown. However, when South Champion (and No. 1 ranked) Oklahoma lost to North Champion Kansas State in the Big 12 championship game, Kansas State received the Big 12 Conference's automatic BCS bid as conference champion and joined Oklahoma in the BCS. The BCS rules specified that no more than two teams from a single conference could receive bids. Texas was frozen out.

Although Brown consistently led the Longhorns to a bowl game to cap off each season in his first six years, he was not able to lead them to a Bowl Championship Series game, having to settle each year for the Holiday Bowl or Cotton Bowl Classic. His record in these games was 3–3, with two of the three losses coming at the hands of supposedly inferior teams as judged by the rankings headed into the games.

2004 season

In 2004, the Longhorns began the season with a No. 7 ranking nationally and had risen to No. 5 coming into the annual matchup with then No. 2 Oklahoma in the Red River Shootout. Oklahoma shutout the Longhorns 12–0. Texas dropped to No. 9, before rebounding with wins over No. 24 Missouri, 28–20, at No. 24 Texas Tech, 51–21, and at Colorado, 31–7. Then Texas set a record for the largest come from-behind-win in school history, beating No. 19 Oklahoma State, 56–35, after falling behind 35–7. After this performance, Texas again fell behind against Kansas, but squeaked out a win 27–23. Kansas head coach Mark Mangino stirred up controversy by claiming that the officials were biased in favor of Texas because the conference wanted a second team in a BCS bowl game and Texas was in position to gain an at-large BCS bid. The series of victories brought Texas back up to No. 5 in the rankings as they welcomed arch-rival Texas A&M to Austin and won 26–13. However, Oklahoma stood undefeated, which meant the Sooners would represent the Big 12 South in the championship game against a much lower ranked team from the North Division. Once again, the loss to Oklahoma had kept Texas out of playing for a national or conference title, and had seemingly destined them to a non-BCS bowl as well.

With Texas and California both vying for a spot in the Rose Bowl, Brown received criticism for lobbying on behalf of his team, which many perceived was a factor in UT's Rose Bowl invitation. Cal was denied what would have been their first Rose Bowl bid since 1958. "I thought it was a little classless how Coach Brown was begging for votes," Cal quarterback Aaron Rodgers told reporters in Berkeley. "I think a team's record and the way you play should speak for itself." Cal's only loss was a 23–17 nailbiter on the road at USC. Cal dominated the game statistically, more than doubling USC in total yardage. The Golden Bears had a first-and-goal from the 9-yard-line with roughly one minute left in the fourth quarter, but could not convert. Meanwhile, Texas's lone loss was a 12–0 defeat to Oklahoma on a neutral field. USC and Oklahoma, the teams Cal and Texas lost to, respectively, went on to play in the national championship. USC blew out Oklahoma 55–19 in that game. However, Texas fans point to the Holiday Bowl, where Cal was dealt a 45–31 loss at the hands of No. 23 Texas Tech, a team which Texas defeated 51–21 earlier in the season.

Brown's Longhorns accepted the bid to play in the Rose Bowl. It was the first visit by the Longhorns, due mainly to the fact that the Rose Bowl traditionally pitted the winner of the Pac-10 against the winner of the Big Ten. Texas's opponent was Michigan, whom Texas was playing for the first time. Texas won the game, 38–37, on a last second field goal by kicker Dusty Mangum in what had been called one of the greatest Rose Bowl games of all time. Despite the success of the 2004 season, Coach Brown's resume was still lacking both a conference championship and a national championship.

2005 season

Texas opened the season ranked No. 2 behind USC in every preseason poll. Led by quarterback Vince Young, Texas defeated their early opponents easily, including a decisive 45–12 victory over Oklahoma. That marked the 6th time the Longhorns entered the contest ranked 2nd nationally, and they have won all six times. With the win, Texas started the season 5–0 for the first time since 1983. That season was the last time UT had national title hopes, when they ended the regular season 11–0 before losing to Georgia in the Cotton Bowl Classic.

After a win over previously undefeated Texas Tech, Texas moved into first place in the Bowl Championship Series (BCS) standings for the first time since its creation. However, the following week Texas fell back down to No. 2 in the BCS poll, while USC moved back into the #1 spot. Both teams won all their remaining games, with USC and Texas remaining ranked No. 1 and #2 throughout the rest of the regular season.

The two teams finally met in the BCS National Championship Game at the 2006 Rose Bowl in a highly anticipated matchup. Texas and USC were the only two unbeaten NCAA Division I-A (now FBS) teams (Auburn was also undefeated in 2004), and the game marked the first time two teams averaging over 50 points per game had met. The combined 53-game win streak was an NCAA record for teams playing each other and the game was also the first to have teams ranked first and second in every iteration of the BCS standings. The game also featured USC's two Heisman winners (Reggie Bush, Matt Leinart) as well as a Heisman finalist in Vince Young. In an up and down game, Texas eventually defeated USC 41–38, highlighted by a 4th and 5 touchdown run and 2 point conversion by Vince Young in the final minute, giving the Longhorns their first national championship in 34 years.

2006 season

After defeating USC the year before in the BCS Championship game to finish with the undisputed No. 1 ranking, Texas began the 2006 season ranked No. 2 in the optimistic pre-season polls, having replaced the NFL-departed quarterback Vince Young with freshman Colt McCoy. The Longhorns however lost convincingly to No. 1 ranked Ohio State in the second game of the season in Austin. The Horns quickly rebounded to win seven straight games (including a second straight win over nemesis Oklahoma in the Red River Shootout) to climb into the Big 12 South driver's seat and entertain thoughts of a rematch with Ohio State in the national championship, but in the season's 10th game McCoy was injured and Texas was shocked on the road at Kansas State. After the loss, the Horns returned home still needing a final win to clinch the Big 12 South, and even though McCoy returned for the annual matchup Texas was again shocked, losing, 12–7, to intrastate rival Texas A&M. The loss snapped UT's six-game winning streak over the Aggies and the horns settled for the Alamo Bowl where Texas defeated a 6–6 Iowa team in a close game to cap off a 10 win season.

2007 season

Mack Brown entered his 10th season as the head coach of the Texas Longhorns with a record of 93–22 setting a new mark above 0.8 winning percentage (.809), the best in Longhorn history. The 2007 Texas Longhorns football team began play ranked third in the all-time list of both total wins and winning percentage, and were ranked in the Top 10 by numerous pre-season polls.

Despite expectations, prior to and during the season a total of seven UT players were suspended for various infractions. Brown said “I am extremely disappointed that four of our student-athletes have had issues with the law this summer. That is not reflective of the high standard of class, character and integrity we have established at Texas for many years. It’s a shame that these recent events have generated a great deal of negative attention, because I do think that overall, this is as good of a group of kids that I’ve ever coached. I think that will show over time.” The negative publicity was more extensive than in past instances but Mack Brown publicly supported the players while denouncing their actions.

For the second straight year, UT merchandise were the top-selling products among buyers of Collegiate Licensing Company. UT used part of the money to give Mack Brown a raise: the University of Texas Board of Regents voted unanimously to raise Brown's salary by $300,000, bringing his annual compensation to $2.81 million and keeping him among the five highest paid coaches in the sport. The package also contained provisions for up to $3 million in bonuses, including "$100,000 if he wins the Big 12 Championship and $450,000 if he wins this year's national championship, as well as bonuses based on the percent of players who graduate." Brown's contract was extended through the 2016 season and includes buy-out clauses should another school attempt to hire Brown.

For the football season, Texas won their first four games although three of them were closer than analysts had expected. In their next game Texas was beaten for a second year in a row by the Kansas State Wildcats 41–21 through play with no turnovers and 21  combined points from defense and special teams.  The Kansas State Wildcats scored one touchdown on a punt return, one on a kick return, and one on an interception; Previously, Texas had never allowed all three types of scores in a single season. The 41 points were the most scored against Texas in Austin since UCLA handed the Longhorns a 66–3 loss in 1997, and it was the worst home defeat in the Mack Brown era at Texas. Texas lost again the following week in the 2007 Red River Shootout, 28–21. With that loss, Texas opened conference play 0–2 for the first time since 1956, when they were in the Southwest Conference and one year before Darrell Royal became head coach of the Longhorns. But that was as bad as it got for Mack Brown during the first decade of the 21st century. In their ninth regular season game, Texas outscored Nebraska 28–25, marking Brown's 100th win at Texas. In their next two games, the Longhorns would defeat Oklahoma State and Texas Tech, but in their final matchup against archrival Texas A&M, the Longhorns lost 30–38. This marked the Longhorns' second straight loss to the Aggies. Despite the loss, Texas went to the Holiday Bowl to defeat 11th-ranked Arizona State 52–34. The Longhorns finished the season 10–3, marking their seventh consecutive 10-win season, the third longest of all time in FBS history, trailing Florida State's 14 from 1987 to 2000 and Miami's 8 from 1985 to 1992.

2008 season

The 2008 Texas Longhorns football team entered the season ranked 10th in the USA Today Coaches Poll. They won their first four games to rise to number 5 in the national rankings. Texas began Big 12 Conference play on October 4, 2008, with a trip to Boulder, Colorado and a win over the Colorado Buffaloes. On October 11, 2008, they defeated the number-one ranked Oklahoma Sooners in the 103rd Red River Shootout. It was the third UT win in four seasons, and the first time in Brown's tenure for either team to upset the other in the Red River Shootout.

Following the victory over OU, the Longhorns vaulted up the standings to first place in the AP, ESPN/USA Today, and Harris Polls. In their next game they secured a win over No. 11 Missouri in Austin, setting a new school, state, and conference attendance record in the process. It was the first time since 1977 for the Longhorns to play a home football game as the No. 1 team in the AP. Texas's reign at the top of the BCS standings was soon brought to an end; however, by the then seventh-ranked Red Raiders of Texas Tech. In a game played before a record-setting national television audience on November 1, 2008, the Longhorns, who trailed the entire game, took the lead with one minute and twenty-eight seconds remaining on the clock. Texas Tech then scored a comeback touchdown with one second remaining to win the game 39–33, keeping Texas out of the Big 12 Championship Game and national title pictures. Texas finished the 2008 regular season with a win over Texas A&M, the Longhorns' longest-running rivalry opponent. The biggest margin of victory in the history of the series occurred when Texas beat A&M 48–0 in 1898. Texas nearly equaled that record in 2008 by producing a 49–9 victory, the second-largest margin of victory for this rivalry series. It was also the 200th career win for Mack Brown, and it set a new attendance record for UT, the State of Texas, the Big 12 Conference, and the southwest region. Texas would go on to win the 2009 Fiesta Bowl by beating Ohio State, 24–21.

Final years at Texas 
In 2009, Texas went undefeated in the regular season to win the Big 12 South Division. They defeated Nebraska in the Big 12 Championship Game to earn a berth in the national title game against Alabama. QB Colt McCoy was injured early in the game and did not return, leaving the offense in the hands of inexperienced true freshman Garrett Gilbert. Alabama dominated Texas to win the national title. Brown would coach the Longhorns for four more seasons. However, the teams would not match the success of the previous years. In 2010, the team had a losing record and did not play in a bowl game for the first and only time under Brown. On December 14, 2013, he announced his resignation as Texas's Head Coach effective following that season's bowl game.

Return to North Carolina
On November 27, 2018, Brown was named head coach at North Carolina after a 5-year absence from coaching and 21 years after he left UNC for Texas.  In his first game coaching in 6 years and first game as North Carolina's coach in 22 years, the Tar Heels upset the South Carolina Gamecocks in Charlotte 24–20.  Coincidentally his first game as North Carolina's coach in 1988 came against South Carolina.  In the home opener a week later, the Tar Heels defeated the Miami Hurricanes on a last-minute touchdown. Two weeks later, they nearly upset No. 1 ranked and defending national champion Clemson, but what would have been the go-ahead two-point conversion failed. It proved to be the only close game Clemson had in the regular season.

The following week, Brown's Tar Heels defeated Georgia Tech 38–22. It was Brown's 72nd win with the Tar Heels, tying Dick Crum as the winningest coach in school history. He broke the record two weeks later with a 20–17 victory over Duke.  On November 30, UNC defeated NC State 41–10 to become bowl eligible for the first time since 2016. They then routed Temple 55–13 in the Military Bowl.

Brown's second tenure as Tar Heel coach has seen a significant uptick in recruiting. Shortly after returning to Chapel Hill, Brown convinced Sam Howell, a highly touted high school quarterback from Indian Trail, North Carolina (a suburb of Charlotte) to de-commit from Florida State. Chazz Surratt, one of the team's quarterbacks for the previous two seasons under Larry Fedora, switched to the defensive end of the ball and became an all-ACC linebacker. Despite losing six games in his first season back, Brown's influence was evident by the team's performances on the field.

In 2020, Brown led the Tar Heels to a tie for third place in the ACC (divisional play had been suspended due to the COVID-19 pandemic). With both Clemson and Notre Dame selected for the College Football Playoff, the Tar Heels received a berth in the Orange Bowl as the highest-ranked remaining ACC team. It was the Tar Heels' first major-bowl appearance since after the 1949 season. Brown's Tar Heels lost 41–27 to No. 5 Texas A&M, but held the lead early in the fourth quarter. 

Entering the 2021 season, Brown's Tar Heels were ranked 9th in the preseason AP Poll and were picked by the media to win the ACC Coastal Division. Junior quarterback Sam Howell was poised to be one of the favorites for the Heisman Trophy and was picked as the preseason ACC Player of the Year. The Tar Heels entered the season with the highest expectations in over a decade.  

However, a week one loss to unranked Virginia Tech and subsequent losses to Georgia Tech and Florida State derailed the season. Despite falling short of expectations, Brown was able to guide the Tar Heels to bowl eligibility for the third straight season, thanks in part to a dramatic comeback win over a top ten Wake Forest team in Kenan Stadium. It was only the third time the Tar Heels have ever defeated a team ranked in the top 10 of a major media poll. Despite losing the Duke's Mayo Bowl to South Carolina and finishing the season with a losing record for the first time since his return, Brown signed the second consecutive top-15 recruiting class of his second stint as the Tar Heel head coach.

2022
Going into the 2022 season, Brown's Tar Heels were plagued with a number of question marks on both sides of the ball. Defensive coordinator Jay Bateman was let go, following the worst defensive performance of Bateman's tenure in Chapel Hill the previous season. Hired to replace him was Gene Chizik, who had previously been on Brown's staff at Texas before winning a National Championship at Auburn in 2010 as a head coach. Chizik's last coaching job prior to taking a five-year hiatus was under previous Tar Heel coach Fedora as the Heels' DC in 2015 and 2016. The biggest question mark was who would replace Sam Howell at quarterback. Redshirt-freshman Drake Maye and sophomore Jacolby Criswell competed in what was described as a "heated" position battle through spring practices and training camp. Maye would win the job, and was officially named the starter the week of the season opener against FAMU. Maye would go on to challenge for, and break, several of the Tar Heels' single season QB records in his first full season under center. Maye and Brown led the team to a 9–3 regular season and North Carolina's first ACC Coastal Division championship since 2015. This would also be the final Coastal Division championship, as in 2023 the ACC will abandon divisions for football. Brown's 2022 Tar Heels also achieved an undefeated road record for the first time in school history.

Traditions
Since returning to Chapel Hill, Brown has started a tradition of lighting the Morehead-Patterson Bell Tower Carolina blue after every win. He carried this tradition over from his time at Texas; for many years the Texas Tower has been lit burnt orange after Longhorn wins.

Notable statistics and accomplishments
2005 NCAA Football National Championship (game played in January 2006)
2005 NCAA Football Coach of the Year
20 consecutive winning seasons
18 consecutive bowl game appearances
162 consecutive weeks ranked in the AP poll from 2000 to 2010 and 192 consecutive weeks ranked in the coach's poll from 1998 to 2010.
Big 12 Conference record 21 consecutive conference wins from 2004 to 2006.
Player awards at Texas under Brown include a Heisman Trophy winner (Ricky Williams), three Maxwell Award winners (Ricky Williams, Vince Young, Colt McCoy), two Davey O'Brien Award Winners (Vince Young, Colt McCoy), two Doak Walker Award winners (Ricky Williams, Cedric Benson), a Butkus Award winner, two Thorpe Award winners and four national player of the year honors. Texas has also had 23 All-Americans, 37 first-team All-Big 12 selections, three Big 12 Offensive Players of the Year, two Big 12 Conference Defensive Players of the Year and seven Big 12 Freshman of the Year honorees.
UT posted back-to-back 11-win seasons, nine consecutive 10-win seasons and ten consecutive 9-win campaigns for the first time in school history. However, Texas played a maximum of only 11 games per season up until 1975 and only 12 games per season up until 1995 (including conference championship and bowl game).
The Longhorns under Brown featured the only 3,000-yard passer, the only 2,000-yard rusher, the only 1,000-yard receivers and the only 1,000-yard passer/rusher in UT history (again, note the longer seasons in recent decades).
Brown is one of only three head coaches in FBS history to coach players who recorded a 2,000-yard rushing season, a 1,000-yard receiving season and a 3,000-yard passing season. Also, Vince Young stands as the first player in NCAA history to rush for 1,000 yards (1,050) and throw for 3,000 yards (3,036) in a single season.
Under Brown's tenure, only five players have left the Texas team for the NFL Draft with any eligibility remaining. The first was Kwame Cavil who went undrafted. Vince Young was drafted third overall in the 2006 NFL Draft. Jamaal Charles and Jermichael Finley both announced they would enter the 2008 NFL Draft and were both drafted in the 3rd round (73rd and 91st overall, respectively). Earl Thomas left Texas after the 2009 season and was drafted in the 1st round of the 2010 NFL Draft. Other players, such as Jevan Snead have elected to transfer to other schools.
From 2001 through 2009, Brown won 10 or more games each year.
The Longhorns under Brown were 32–17 against their four archrivals: Texas A&M, Oklahoma, Arkansas and Texas Tech.
The Longhorns were 10–5 in Bowl games under Brown.
With Bobby Bowden's retirement after the 2009 season, Brown became first among all active coaches with 20 consecutive winning seasons.(until his losing season in 2010–2011 5–7)
 Mack Brown won the 2008 Bobby Dodd Coach of the Year award from the Bobby Dodd Foundation.
In 2012, he was elected third vice president of the American Football Coaches Association which places him in line per AFCA tradition to move up one level each year until becoming president in 2015.
When combined with his brother Watson Brown, they compose the pair of brothers with the most combined wins, and the most combined losses, in NCAA Division I football history.
 Brown was inducted into the Tennessee Sports Hall of Fame in 2015.

Outside of football

Mack Brown's wife is named Sally. They have four children: Matt Jessee, Katherine Ryan, Barbara Wilson, and Chris Jessee.

In Austin, Mack and Sally continue to be active in community affairs, serving as honorary co-chairpersons of the Capital Campaign for the Helping Hands of Austin. They have also been instrumental in the opening of The Rise School of Austin (an early childhood education program that integrates children who have disabilities with their typically developing peers) and serve on the school's board of directors. They lent their name along with legendary UT QB James Street to the First Annual James Street/Mack Brown Golf Tournament benefiting The Rise School. The Browns have endorsed a new Texas license plate, which is designed to raise public awareness for child abuse and neglect, and the need for Court Appointed Special Advocates (CASA) volunteers. After the Aggie Bonfire tragedy at Texas A&M in 1999, the couple initiated a blood drive on the UT campus that attracted more than 250 blood donors. Austin Mayor Lee Leffingwell pronounced January 30, 2014, "Mack and Sally Brown Day" in honor of the many contributions the Browns had made to the city of Austin during Mack's time as head coach of the Longhorns.

In October 2006, Mack Brown made a cameo appearance in the television pilot for Friday Night Lights. Early in the show, a resident is heard to say "Who does [Coach Taylor] think he is? Mack Brown? He's no Mack Brown." Later in the pilot, the real Mack Brown plays the role of a local football booster quizzing high school coach Eric Taylor on his pre-game preparation. As Longhorn coach, Brown also appeared in commercials for College GameDay where he sang "Texas Fight" with the GameDay crew.

Head coaching record

*Brown left for Texas shortly after the end of the 1997 regular season. Carl Torbush coached the Tar Heels in the 1998 Gator Bowl. North Carolina credits the regular season to Brown and the Gator Bowl to Torbush.
^Due to tiebreakers, Texas did not compete in the Big 12 Championship game.

See also
 List of college football coaches with 200 wins

References

External links

 North Carolina profile
 

1951 births
Living people
American football running backs
Appalachian State Mountaineers football coaches
College football announcers
Florida State Seminoles football coaches
Florida State Seminoles football players
Iowa State Cyclones football coaches
LSU Tigers football coaches
Memphis Tigers football coaches
North Carolina Tar Heels football coaches
Oklahoma Sooners football coaches
Southern Miss Golden Eagles football coaches
Texas Longhorns football coaches
Tulane Green Wave athletic directors
Tulane Green Wave football coaches
Vanderbilt Commodores football players
University of Southern Mississippi alumni
People from Cookeville, Tennessee
Coaches of American football from Tennessee
Players of American football from Tennessee